Hwamyeong station is a train station in northern Busan, South Korea.

It was most recently rebuilt in 1999.

The train and subway stations are not connected directly.

Tourist attractions 

Geumgok-dong Ulypaechong
Daecheon river baby temple

See also
Transportation in South Korea

References

External links

Railway stations in Busan
Buk District, Busan
Railway stations in South Korea opened in 1999